The green anaconda (Eunectes murinus), also known as the giant emerald anaconda, common anaconda, common water boa or sucuri, is a boa species found in South America. It is the heaviest and one of the longest known extant snake species. No subspecies are currently recognized. Like all boas, it is a non-venomous constrictor.

The term "anaconda" often refers to this species, though the term could also apply to other members of the genus Eunectes. Fossils of the snake date back to the Late Pleistocene in the Gruta do Urso locality.

Etymology

The green anaconda's specific name is derived from the Latin , meaning 'of mice', for being thought to prey on mice.

Description

It is the largest snake native to the Americas. Although it is slightly shorter than the reticulated python, it is far bulkier; the bulk of a  green anaconda is comparable to that of a  reticulated python. Reports of anacondas  or even longer also exist, but such claims must be regarded with caution, as no specimens of such lengths have ever been deposited in a museum and hard evidence is lacking.

The color pattern consists of an olive green background overlaid with black blotches along the length of the body. The head is narrow compared to the body, usually with distinctive orange-yellow striping on either side. The eyes are set high on the head, allowing the snake to see out of the water while swimming without exposing its body. The anaconda's jaw bones splay open at the front because they are loosely connected. This allows it to swallow prey larger than the size of its head. The windpipe in its mouth allows it to breathe while swallowing its prey. Its largest organ is the liver. The digestion process takes many days to complete and during this time the anaconda behaves very sluggishly.

Difficulties in determining maximum size
The remote location of the snake's habitat has historically made locating, capturing, and returning specimens difficult. Transporting very large specimens to museums, especially before substantial decay, is difficult (though this has not prevented the return of much larger and more cumbersome crocodilian specimens). Skins can stretch substantially, increasing the snake's size by more than 50% if stretched during the tanning process. Reports without physical proof are considered dubious if from non-scientists, as such individuals may at worst be more interested in promoting themselves or telling a good tale, or at the least may not be sufficiently trained in proper measurement methods. Observational reports of animals which were not captured are even more dubious, as even trained scientists often substantially overestimate the size of anacondas prior to capture. According to the Guinness Book of World Records, this species has been perhaps subject to the most extreme size exaggerations of any living animal.

Historical records
Numerous historical accounts of green anacondas are reported, often of improbable sizes. Numerous estimates and second-hand accounts abound, but are generally considered unreliable. To prove the point of overestimating, in Guyana in 1937, zoologist Alpheus Hyatt Verrill asked the expedition team he was with to estimate the length of a large, curled-up anaconda on a rock.

The estimated weight for an anaconda in the range of  would be at least .

Current estimates of maximal size
Size presents challenges to attain breeding condition in larger female anacondas. While larger sizes provide the benefit of a larger number of offspring per clutch, the breeding frequency of the individuals reduces with size, indicating that a point exists at which the advantage of a larger clutch size is negated by the female no longer being able to breed. This is consistent with the results of a revision of the size at maturity and maximum size of several snakes from North America, which found that the maximum size is between 1.5 and 2.5 times the size at maturity. However, most anacondas are captured from the llanos, which is more accessible to humans and has smaller prey available, while the rainforest, which is much less explored and has more plentiful large prey, may be home to larger snakes.

Scientific and common names

In the famous 10th edition of Systema Naturae of 1758, Carl Linnaeus cited descriptions by Albertus Seba and by Laurens Theodorus Gronovius to erect the distinct species murina of his new genus Boa, which contained eight other species, including Boa constrictor. The generic name Boa came from an ancient Latin word for a type of large snake. In 1830, Johann Georg Wagler erected the separate genus Eunectes for Linnaeus's Boa murina after more and larger specimens were known and described. Because of the masculine gender of Eunectes, the feminine Latin specific name murina was changed to murinus.

Linnaeus almost certainly chose the scientific name Boa murina based on the original Latin description given by Albertus Seba in 1735: "Serpens testudinea americana, murium insidiator" [tortoise-patterned (spotted) American snake, a predator that lies in wait for mice (and rats)]. The Latin adjective murinus (murina) in this case would mean "of mice" or "connected with mice", understood in context as "preying on mice", and not as "mouse-gray-colored" (another possible meaning of Latin murinus) as now often wrongly indicated for E. murinus. Early English-language sources, such as George Shaw, referred to the Boa murina as the "rat boa" and the Penny Cyclopaedia (Vol. 5) entry for boa explained: "The trivial name murina was given to it from being said to lie in wait for mice." Linnaeus described the appearance of the Boa murina in Latin as rufus maculis supra rotundatis [reddish-brown with rounded spots on upper parts] and made no reference to a gray coloration. Early descriptions of the green anaconda by different authors variously referred to the general color like brown, glaucous, green, or gray.

Common names for E. murinus include green anaconda, anaconda, common anaconda, and water boa.

Distribution and habitat
Eunectes murinus is found in South America east of the Andes, in countries including Colombia, Venezuela, the Guianas, Ecuador, Peru, Bolivia, Brazil, the island of Trinidad, and as far south as northern Paraguay. The type locality given is "America".

At least one anaconda, a juvenile, has been found in the Florida Everglades.

Anacondas live in swamps, marshes, and slow-moving streams, mainly in the tropical rainforests of the Amazon and Orinoco basins. They are cumbersome on land, but stealthy and sleek in the water. Their eyes and nasal openings are on top of their heads, allowing them to lie in wait for prey while remaining nearly completely submerged.

Behavior

The primarily nocturnal anacondas tend to spend most of their lives in or around water. They have the potential to reach high speeds when swimming. They tend to float beneath the surface of the water with their snouts above the surface. When prey passes by or stops to drink, the anaconda strikes (without eating or swallowing it) and coils around it with its body. The snake then constricts until it has suffocated the prey.

Feeding

Primarily aquatic, they are apex predators, preying on a wide variety of prey, almost anything they can manage to overpower, including fish, amphibians, birds, a variety of mammals, and other reptiles. Particularly large anacondas may consume large prey such as tapirs, deer, peccaries, capybaras, jaguars, and caimans, but such large meals are not regularly consumed. Juvenile anacondas feed on prey such as small birds and juvenile caiman that are typically 40–70 grams in size. As they develop, their diet becomes increasingly complex. Prey availability varies more in grasslands than in river basins. Green anacondas in both habitats have been found to feed on large prey, usually ranging from 14% to 50% of its own mass. A few examples of their prey include broad-snouted caimans, spectacled caimans, yacare caimans, smooth-fronted caimans, wattled jacanas, capybaras, red-rumped agoutis, collared peccaries, South American tapirs, boa constrictors, brown-banded water snakes, green iguanas, cryptic golden tegus, scorpion mud turtles, gibba turtles, Arrau turtles, savanna side-necked turtles, red side-necked turtles, and northern pudús. Green anacondas take a high risk by feeding on larger prey, which occasionally lead to serious injuries or even death. Some also feed on carrion and conspecifics, usually inside or around water. Large anacondas can go weeks to months without food after eating a large meal, because of their low metabolism. However, females show increased postpartum feeding rates to recover from their reproductive investment. The green anaconda's eyes and nose are located on the top of the head, allowing the snake to breathe and watch for prey while the vast majority of the body is hidden underwater. Many local stories and legends report the anaconda as a man-eater, but little evidence supports any such activity. They employ constriction to subdue their prey. Cannibalism among green anacondas is also known, most recorded cases involving a larger female consuming a smaller male. While the exact reason for this is not understood, scientists cite several possibilities, including the dramatic sexual dimorphism in the species, and the possibility that a female anaconda requires additional food intake after breeding to sustain the long period of gestation. The nearby male simply provides the opportunistic female a ready source of nutrition.

Reproduction

This species is solitary until the mating season, which occurs during the rainy season, and can last for several months, usually from April to May. During this time, males must find females. Typically, female snakes lay down a trail of pheromones for the males to follow, but how the males of this species track a female's scent is still unclear. Another possibility is that the female releases an airborne stimulant. This theory is supported by the observation of females that remain motionless, while many males move towards them from all directions. Male anacondas also frequently flick their tongues to sense chemicals that signal the presence of a female.

Many males can often find the same female. This results in odd clusters referred to as "breeding balls", in which up to 12 males wrap around the same female and attempt to copulate. The groups can stay in this position for two to four weeks. This ball acts as a slow-motion wrestling match between the males, each one fighting for the opportunity to mate with the female.

During mating, males make use of their spurs to arouse the female. They aggressively press their cloacal regions hard against the female body, while continuously scratching her with their spurs. This can produce a scratching sound. Mating approaches its climax when the stimulus of the males' spurs induces the female snake to raise her cloacal region, allowing the cloacae of the two snakes to move together. The male then coils his tail, surrounding the female, and they copulate. The strongest and largest male is often the victor. However, females are physically much larger and stronger and may decide to choose from among the males. Courtship and mating occur almost exclusively in water.

Mating is followed by a gestation period of six to seven months. The species is ovoviviparous, with females giving birth to live young. Litters usually consist of 20 to 40 offspring, although as many as 100 may be produced. After giving birth, females may lose up to half their weight.

Because of their small size, they often fall prey to other animals. Should they survive, they grow rapidly until they reach sexual maturity in their first few years, after which they continue to grow at a slower pace.

However, when no male anacondas are available to provide offspring, facultative parthenogenesis is possible. In August 2014, West Midlands Safari Park announced that on 12 August 2014 a female green anaconda, which was being kept with another female anaconda, through parthenogenesis had given birth to three young.

Longevity
Green Anacondas in the wild live for approximately 10 years. In captivity, however, they can live up to 30 years and beyond. The current Guinness Book of World Records for the oldest living snake in captivity is a green anaconda aged 37 years 317 days when verified (14 May 2021 – Paul Swires) held by Annie the Green Anaconda, currently at Montecasino Bird & Reptile Park in Johannesburg, South Africa.

In popular culture
Anacondas have been portrayed in horror literature and films, often incredibly gigantic and with the ability to swallow adult humans; these traits are occasionally also attributed to other species, such as the Burmese python, the reticulated python, but with much less extend than to the green anaconda. Despite with the capability to overpower a man, there is no verified evidence of this species consuming humans, unlike the reticulated python. This is possibly because of its much less proximity to civilization since large specimen inhabits remote areas deep inside the Amazon jungle which is isolated from humans, unlike the python in Asia. Among the most popular of such films are the 1997 film Anaconda and its four sequels.

References

Bibliography

Further reading

External links

 
 

Apex predators
Eunectes
Fauna of the Amazon
Reptiles described in 1758
Reptiles of the Caribbean
Reptiles of Bolivia
Reptiles of Brazil
Reptiles of Colombia
Reptiles of Ecuador
Reptiles of Guyana
Reptiles of Paraguay
Reptiles of Peru
Reptiles of Trinidad and Tobago
Reptiles of Venezuela
Snakes of South America
Taxa named by Carl Linnaeus